Scoparia subfusca is a species of moth of the family Crambidae. It is found in Europe.

The wingspan is 20–27 mm. The forewings are brown-grey, mixed or suffused with whitish, sometimes with a few black scales; a short black dash from base of costa; lines whitish, dark-edged internally, first curved, second angularly bent above middle; orbicular indistinctly outlined with blackish, touching first line; claviform indistinct, blackish, touching first line; a blackish X-shaped discal mark, upper half filled with brownish: subterminal
line very cloudy, whitish. Hindwings are whitish-grey. The larva is whitish; dorsal line blackish; spots large, ochreous-tinged; head brown; plate of 2 pale brownish.

The moth flies from May to September depending on the location.

The larvae feed on Picris hieracioides and Tussilago.

References

External links
 Lepidoptera of Belgium
 UK Moths
 waarneming.nl  

Scorparia
Moths described in 1811
Moths of Europe